Banco de Occidente may refer to
 Banco de Occidente Credencial, a financial bank in Colombia
 Banco de Occidente (Honduras), a financial bank in Honduras